Dale O'Halloran (born 15 February 1955) is an Australian former cricketer. He played one first-class match for Tasmania in 1980/81.

See also
 List of Tasmanian representative cricketers

References

External links
 

1955 births
Living people
Australian cricketers
Tasmania cricketers
Cricketers from Tasmania